Cimeliomorpha is a genus of moths belonging to the subfamily Olethreutinae of the family Tortricidae.

Species
Cimeliomorpha cymbalora (Meyrick, 1907)
Cimeliomorpha egregiana (Felder & Rogenhofer, 1875)
Cimeliomorpha nabokovi Kuznetzov, 1997
Cimeliomorpha novarana (Felder & Rogenhofer, 1875)

See also
List of Tortricidae genera

References

External links
tortricidae.com

Tortricidae genera
Olethreutinae
Taxa named by Alexey Diakonoff